Ajay Binay Institute of Technology is an ISO 9000:2000 certified institution in Cuttack, Odisha, India, affiliated to the Biju Patnaik University of Technology, Rourkela. The institute was established in 1998 and is affiliated to AICTE. The campus is located within the city limits of cuttack and has a total student strength of over 2000. The main campus houses the Administrative block, Engineering, MBA and Architecture wings.  The ITC wing is located in a second campus within a distance of 5 km from the main campus. The post graduate courses are conducted from the main campus.

The Piloo Mody College of Architecture is Council of Architecture (COA) recognised and is also a registered NATA test centre. The department of architecture is currently in its 21st year since its inception back in 1993.

Infrastructure and campus information 

The school is situated in Cuttack, the cultural and literary capital of Odisha.  The campus is at a distance of 25 km from the state capital of Bhubaneswar.  There are 5 buildings on two campuses. The college also provides hostel facilities to boys and girls and are located nearby, served by a regular bus service operated by the college.

Campus A houses architecture, engineering, MBA, MCA and the junior science college, and Campus B houses the Industrial Training Institute (ITI).

The library at ABIT is a  space with a seating capacity of 100 students.

Undergraduate courses 
 Bachelor in Architecture (Piloo Mody College Of Architecture)
 B.Tech. Computer Science and Engineering
 B.Tech. Electronics and Telecommunication Engineering
 B.Tech. Mechanical Engineering
 B.Tech. Electrical Engineering
 B.Tech. Civil Engineering
 B.Tech. Electrical and Electronics Engineering ( Renamed as Electrical and Computer Engineering in 2020)
 Electronics and Instrumentation (closed in 2014)

Post graduate courses 
 Masters in Architecture
 MCA
 MBA
 M.Tech. Computer Science and Engineering

Professional courses 
 five year Programme for fitters
 five year Programme for electricians

Faculty 
ABIT has over 105 permanent teaching staff.

Cultural activities 
 Fresher's day
 NSS unit
 ignitron–intercollegiate techno-cultural fest

References 

 https://www.edufever.com/abit-cuttack/

External links 
 Official Website of ABIT

All India Council for Technical Education
Architecture schools in India
Engineering colleges in Odisha
Universities and colleges in Odisha
Business schools in Odisha
Colleges affiliated with Biju Patnaik University of Technology
Education in Cuttack
Educational institutions established in 1998
1998 establishments in Orissa